The 1996–97 Maryland Terrapins men's basketball team represented the University of Maryland in the 1996–1997 college basketball season as a member of the Atlantic Coast Conference (ACC). The team was led by head coach Gary Williams and played their home games at the Cole Field House. They received an at-large bid as the number 5 seed in the Southeast region of the 1997 NCAA tournament, where they lost to College of Charleston in the opening round.

Roster

Schedule and results 

|-
!colspan=11 style=| Regular season

|-
!colspan=11 style=| ACC tournament

|-
!colspan=11 style=| 1999 NCAA Men's Basketball tournament

Rankings

References

Maryland Terrapins men's basketball seasons
Maryland
Maryland
Maryland
Maryland